Eurasian Avars may refer to:

 Avars (Caucasus), a people from the North East Caucasus
 Avar Khanate, Caucasus
 Pannonian Avars, a nomadic people who lived on the Eurasian Steppes, before settling in Central Europe
 Avar Khaganate, Central Europe
 ahir, northern India

See also
 Avars (disambiguation)